Lalitha Kumaramangalam (born 1958) is an Indian politician who is a member of the Bharatiya Janata Party (BJP) and former chairperson of the National Commission for Women. She was previously the National Secretary of the Bharatiya Janata Party (BJP).

Family
Lalitha Kumaramangalam was born January 14, 1958 in Tamil Nadu, the daughter of Mohan Kumaramangalam, a communist ideologue, politician, and trade union leader. Her paternal grandfather, P. Subbarayan, was the Chief Minister of the Madras Presidency. Her paternal uncle, General P.P. Kumaramangalam, PVSM, DSO, was Chief of the Army Staff of India. Lalitha's mother, Kalyani Mukherjee, was the niece of Ajoy Mukherjee, Chief Minister of West Bengal, and of Biswanath Mukherjee, husband of the communist ideologue and parliamentarian Geeta Mukherjee. Lalitha is the sister of Rangarajan Kumaramangalam, another prominent politician.

Career
Kumaramangalam is a graduate of St. Stephen's College, Delhi, with a degree in economics, and has an MBA from Madras University. She contested Lok Sabha elections twice as BJP candidate (2004 from Puduchery and 2009 from Tiruchirapalli) after her brother's death, but lost on both occasions. She runs an NGO named Prakriti. She was appointed Chairperson of the National Commission for Women on 29 September 2014.

See also
Political Families of The World

References 

Women in Tamil Nadu politics
Living people
Bharatiya Janata Party politicians from Tamil Nadu
Lalitha
Puducherry politicians
Women in Puducherry politics
21st-century Indian women politicians
21st-century Indian politicians
1958 births